Virdi is a surname. Notable people with this surname include:

 Amar Virdi, English cricket player
 Ginnie Virdi, Indian television actress
 Gurpal Virdi (born 1958), politician
 Harvey Virdi, actress and writer
 Kanwar Virdi (born 1969), Indian cricket player
 R.R. Virdi (born 1990), American author